A statue of the Bee Gees by sculptor Andy Edwards was unveiled in Douglas, Isle of Man, in 2021. It is located on Loch Promenade between Marine Gardens 1 and 2 and opposite Regent Street. The  bronze sculptures depict Barry, Maurice, and Robin Gibb, and the artist was inspired by the group's music video for "Stayin' Alive". The £170,000 project was commissioned in 2019.

See also

 2021 in art
 Statue of Bee Gees (Redcliffe, Queensland)

References

Bee Gees
Bee Gees
Buildings and structures in the Isle of Man
Monuments and memorials in the Isle of Man
Outdoor sculptures
Bee Gees
Bee Gees